Conchopetalum is a genus of flowering plants belonging to the family Sapindaceae.

Its native range is Madagascar.

Species:

Conchopetalum brachysepalum 
Conchopetalum madagascariense

References

Sapindaceae
Sapindaceae genera